The Serbia and Montenegro men's national water polo team, also widely known as the FR Yugoslavia men's national water polo team, represented Serbia and Montenegro in international water polo games, from 1993 to 2006. It was governed by the Water Polo Association of FR Yugoslavia (1992–2003), then the Water Polo Association of Serbia and Montenegro (2003–2006). The team won medals in the Olympics, World and European Championships, FINA World Cup, FINA World League, Mediterranean Games and Universiade.

History
After the breakup of Yugoslavia, in 1991–1992, the original Yugoslavia men's national water polo team was dissolved. Bosnia and Herzegovina (Bosnia and Herzegovina NT), Croatia (Croatia NT), Macedonia (Macedonia NT) (later known as North Macedonia), and Slovenia (Slovenia NT) then formed their own national teams. While the then remaining and smaller Yugoslavia (originally known as FR Yugoslavia, and later as Serbia and Montenegro) formed its own national team. 

That national team was originally named either "Yugoslavia men's national water polo team", or "FR Yugoslavia men's national water polo team", from 1992 until 2003, after the country's name at the time. In 2003, after the country was renamed from FR Yugoslavia to Serbia and Montenegro, the team was also renamed to "Serbia and Montenegro men's national water polo team". After Serbia and Montenegro split up, in 2006, and became the independent countries of Serbia and Montenegro, they each formed their own successor national teams. The first appearance of the Serbia men's national water polo team at a major international competition was at the 2006 European Championship. While the first appearance of the Montenegro men's national water polo team at a major international competition was at the 2007 FINA World League.

Names
 Federal Republic of Yugoslavia (FR Yugoslavia) men's national water polo team: 1992–2003
 Serbia and Montenegro men's national water polo team: 2003–2006

Predecessor and successor teams
 Predecessor team
 
 Successor teams

Competitive record

Medals

Olympic Games

World Championship

World Cup

World League

European Championship

Mediterranean Games

Team

Coaches
 1992–1999 Nikola Stamenić
 1999–2004 Nenad Manojlović
 2004–2006 Petar Porobić

See also
 Serbia and Montenegro men's Olympic water polo team records and statistics
 Yugoslavia men's national water polo team
 Serbia men's national water polo team
 Montenegro men's national water polo team
 List of world champions in men's water polo

References

 
Men's national water polo teams